Huste is a surname. Notable people with the surname include:

Annemarie Huste (1943–2016), German-American chef and cookbook writer
Falk Huste (born 1971), German boxer
Kay Huste (born 1974), German boxer

See also
Husted
Huster